Size Matters is an album by the band Helmet.

Size Matters may also refer to:
Cultural and sexual perceptions of the size of the human penis
"Size Matters (Someday)", a hit country song recorded by Joe Nichols
 "Size Matters" (Charmed), an episode of the US television series Charmed
"Size Matters", the second episode of the UK television series Coupling
Size Matters, the second issue of the comic book M. Rex
Ratchet & Clank: Size Matters, a video game for PSP and PS2
Size does matter, the tagline of Godzilla (1998 film), a humorous comparison to dinosaur movies